Mazenod can refer to the following:

People
St. Eugene de Mazenod, the founder of the Missionary Oblates of Mary Immaculate and patron saint of dysfunctional families.

Places
Mazenod, Lesotho, a town in Lesotho, Southern Africa.
Mazenod, Saskatchewan, a dissolved village in Saskatchewan, Canada.

Schools
There are two Australian Roman Catholic high schools named Mazenod College after St. Eugene de Mazenod:

Mazenod College, Victoria, located in Mulgrave, a suburb of Melbourne, Victoria;
Mazenod College, Western Australia, located in Lesmurdie, a suburb of Perth, Western Australia.